Adventure is a village located in the Pomeroon-Supenaam Region of Guyana, on the Atlantic coast, at sea level, one mile south of Onderneeming.

Region 5 and 6 both also have villages called 'Adventure' in the 2012 census.

It is a riverine settlement at the mouth of the Essequibo River, and was linked to Wakenaam and Parika by the terminal of ferry service. It is connected by road to the West Coast of Demerara, and to the city of Georgetown via the Demerara Harbour Bridge. It had a night spot, bar and hotel for passengers until  the closure of the stelling and opening of a new stelling in Supenaam in 2011.

Adventure has a nursery school, mosque, a temple and a supermarket. For primary school, student attend in neighboring villages such as Onderneeming or Suddie.

The community is referenced in Gerald Durrell's book, Three Singles to Adventure.

References

Populated places in Pomeroon-Supenaam